Aurana is a genus of snout moths. It was erected by Francis Walker in 1863 and is known from Japan and Australia.

Taxonomy
Some authors list the genus as a synonym of Pempelia.

Species
 Aurana actiosella Walker, 1863
 Aurana vinaceella (Inoue, 1963)

References

External links
 
 

Phycitini
Pyralidae genera